Brachyopa cruriscutum is an Asian species of hoverfly.

Distribution
Turkey.

References

Diptera of Asia
Eristalinae
Insects described in 2014